Jamake Highwater (born Jackie Marks, also known as Jay or J Marks; 14 February 1931 – June 3, 2001) was an American writer and journalist of Eastern European Jewish ancestry who mispresented himself as Cherokee.

In the late 1960s, Marks assumed a pretendian identity, claiming to be Cherokee, and used the name "Jamake Highwater" for his writings. As Highwater, he wrote and published more than 30 fiction and non-fiction books of music, art, poetry and history. His children's novel Anpao: An American Indian Odyssey (1973) received a Newbery Honor. His book The Primal Mind: Vision and Reality in Indian America (1981) was the basis of a PBS film documentary about Native American culture.

Marks was exposed as an imposter in 1984 by activist Hank Adams (Assiniboine) and reporter Jack Anderson in separate publications. Despite this, Marks continued to be widely perceived by the general public as Native American.

Early life, education and career
Jackie Marks was born on 13 February 1931 in Los Angeles to parents Martha (Turetz) Marks, then 27, and Alexander Marks, then 49; they were born in Philadelphia and New York City respectively. His parents each had immigrant grandparents of Eastern European Jewish ancestry; his father's family had likely anglicized their name to Marks. His father's Jewish identification was affirmed by his family requesting a Star of David for his military gravestone. Alexander Marks was a veteran of World War I.

While living in San Francisco, Marks started a small dance company, the San Francisco Contemporary Dancers. He was the principal director and choreographer from 1954 to 1967. Marks moved to New York City around 1969 and started publishing professionally as J. Marks. In New York, he started using the name Jamake Highwater and claiming to be Cherokee. At various times he said his father was Eastern Cherokee and his mother, whom he called Marcia Highwater, was Blackfoot/French.

Career
As Jamake Highwater, Marks wrote and published more than 30 fiction and non-fiction books, including children's books, and works about music, art, poetry and history. His pseudonym "Jamake Highwater" appeared on Anpao: An American Indian Odyssey (1973), a children's book; and The Sun, He Dies: A Novel About the End of the Aztec World (1980).

In 1981, Marks (as Highwater) published a non-fiction book, The Primal Mind: Vision and Reality in Indian America. By this time, he had made many connections in the media world. PBS adapted this book as the basis of a documentary about Native American culture, The Primal Mind (1984). Marks served as the host of the documentary. 

Marks "gained wide public exposure" as Jamake Highwater through making several documentaries on Native American culture for PBS television, and serving as host. In the 1980s, he was known nationally as a Native American figure. In 1993, Marks was a consultant on the TV series Star Trek: Voyager for the character Chakotay. 

Marks also wrote for the New Grove Dictionary of American Music and the Los Angeles Free Press under the Highwater name.

False ancestry claims
Following his move to New York in 1969, Marks claimed his new identity as Jamake Highwater. He said that he had been adopted as an Indian child from Montana by a Greek-American family and raised in Los Angeles (a variation he told was that the family was Armenian). Another time he said that the Marks family had adopted him as a child. In yet another version he said both his parents were Cherokee. He reportedly graduated from North Hollywood High School, attended college in Los Angeles, and gained a PhD degree by the age of 20; this information was never documented.

Marks gave conflicting accounts of his purported Native American background. He never said that he was enrolled in a Cherokee tribe, but that he had "recovered" his Native identity.

Marks's false claims to American Indian ancestry were explored and documented by Hank Adams (Assiniboine) in a 1984 Akwesasne Notes article. He identified Marks's inconsistencies about birthplace and date, parents, college, and other biographical details. Between 1982 and 1983, Marks and his Primal Mind Foundation had received more than $825,000 in federal grant money from the Corporation for Public Broadcasting (CPB), based on his claimed identification as Native American. His claims of Native ancestry were strongly disputed by American Indian activists and intellectuals, who argued that his works were inauthentic and stereotypical. They said that he had illegally received the grant money by misrepresenting material facts about his life.

Investigative journalist Jack Anderson followed up on Marks in 1984, revealing the inconsistencies in the writer's biography and ultimately, his pose. His column, "A Fabricated Indian?", was published in The Washington Post. Following the major exposé by Anderson, Marks stopped claiming Cherokee heritage in his promotional literature; however, he continued to take advantage of having become publicly established as an "Indian" figure. When questioned by Anderson about why he had assumed a Cherokee identity, Marks said that he had thought he could not break into the writing world otherwise.

Two years after Anderson's exposé, Marks published Shadow Show: An Autobiographical Insinuation (1986), in which he wrote: "the greatest mystery of my life is my own identity." Vizenor commented on this that the "impostor" was an artist, and his "insinuations are clever simulations, but surely not a great mystery".

Death and aftermath
Marks died of a heart attack at home on June 3, 2001. Mainstream press such as the New York Times and Los Angeles Times carried obituaries that repeated his false claims about his alleged Native American background. Through his attorney, Marks had blocked access to his papers for at least 50 years.

In response to the published mainstream obituaries, Hank Adams published an open letter that detailed Marks's many falsehoods:

Native American intellectual Gerald Vizenor (Anishinaabe) described individuals such as Marks, who take on false Native American identities, as "varionatives" in his 2000 book Fugitive Poses.

In 2015, Indian Country Today reported additional findings about Marks's elaborate ruse. It published a copy of his 1931 birth certificate from Los Angeles, and a photograph of his father's military gravestone, marked with the Jewish symbol, a Star of David.

Honors and legacy
Marks's children's novel, Anpao: An American Indian Odyssey (1973), received a Newbery Honor. 
Marks's children's books received "a half-dozen Best Book for Young Adults awards from the American Library Association and School Library Journal." 
Marks's book The Primal Mind: Vision and Reality in Indian America (1981) was the basis of a PBS documentary, The Primal Mind (1984).

Representations in other media
According to Alex Jacobs, Gerald Vizenor (Anishinaabe) in his 1988 novel, The Trickster of Liberty, based his character Homer Yellow Snow on Jamake Highwater. Jacobs notes that Yellow Snow says to his Native audience:

If you knew who you were, why did you find it so easy to believe in me? … because you want to be white, and no matter what you say in public, you trust whites more than you trust Indians, which is to say, you trust pretend Indians more than real ones.

See also
Plastic shaman

References

Further reading
Hoxie, Frederick E. Encyclopedia of North American Indians: Native American History, Culture, and Life From Paleo-Indians to the Present, Boston: Houghton Mifflin Harcourt, 2006: 191–2. (retrieved through Google Books, July 26, 2009) 
Kratzert, M. "Native American Literature: Expanding the Canon," Collection Building, Vol. 17, 1, 1998, p. 4.
Nagel, Joane.  American Indian Ethnic Renewal: Red Power and the Resurgence of Identity and Culture, Oxford: University of Oxford Press, 1996: 238. .
Weaver, Jace.  Other Words: American Indian Literature, Law, and Culture, Norman: University of Oklahoma Press, 2001: 138. (retrieved through Google Books, July 26, 2009)

External links
  
 Hank Adams (Assiniboine and Sioux), "An Open Letter To The Los Angeles Times and The Washington Post In the Form of a Last Chapter on Jamake Highwater, written as a Letter to the Contents of Box 34 in the Jamake Highwater Papers of the Manuscripts & Archives Division of the New York Public Library", June 2001.
 Mick McAllister, "Jack Marks Is Dead, Oh Well", Dancing Badger.com blog, June 2001
 

1931 births
2001 deaths
American children's writers
Newbery Honor winners
Writers from Los Angeles
Jewish American writers
20th-century American non-fiction writers
North Hollywood High School alumni
20th-century American Jews
American people who self-identify as being of Native American descent